The Baddest: Hit Parade is a compilation released by Japanese singer Toshinobu Kubota. This album was released in Japan at the end of November 2011 to commemorate the twenty-fifth anniversary of Kubota's music. The album charted at number 2 on the Oricon Weekly Albums chart and remained on the charts for a total of 38 weeks. The album became certified platinum, selling over 351,049+ units in Japan.

Track listing
CD 1
Tawawa Hit Parade (Funkylude)
Ryuusei no Saddle
Kitakaze to Taiyou
Missing
Time (Shower ni Utarete)
Cry On Your Smile
Tawawa Hit Parade
Eien no Tsubasa
Love Reborn
Indigo Waltz
Tawawa Hit Parade (Marvinlude)
Dance If You Want It
Give You My Love
Niji no Grand Slam
Amaoto
Yoru ni Dakarete (A Night in Afro Blue)
Yume with You

CD 2 track list
Tawawa Hit Parade (THE BADDESTlude)
La La La Love Song
Sunshine, Moonlight
Cymbals
The Sound of Carnival
Ahhhhh!
Messengers' Rhyme (Rakushow!, It's your Show!)
Kimi ha Nani wo Miteru
Tawawa Hit Parade (SlowJamlude)
Soul Bangin'
Candy Rain
Kimi no Soba ni
Club Happiness
Tomorrow Waltz
Love Rain (Koi no Ame)
Koe ni Dekinai (Voice & Tears Version)

DVD track list
Note that these are music videos.
Club Happiness
Soul Bangin'
Messengers' Rhyme (Rakushow, It's Your Show!)
Love Rain (Koi no Ame)
Ahhhhh!
Ryuusei no Saddle
Dance If You Want It
La La La Love Song
Yoru ni dakarete (A Night in Afro Blue)
Kimi no Soba ni
Cymbals
Missing
Koe ni Dekinai

Charts

Total reported sales: 351,049
Total sales in 2011: 224,992 (#27 album of the year)
Total sales in 2012: 126,057

References

External links
Oricon profile: 2CD+DVD Limited Edition | 2CD Regular Edition

2011 compilation albums
Toshinobu Kubota albums